Karlo Lulić (born 10 May 1996) is a Croatian footballer who plays as a midfielder for Italian Serie B team Frosinone Calcio.

Club career
Born in Nova Gradiška, Lulić started playing football at his village's club NK Graničar Laze, before moving early to NK Mladost Cernik. In 2010, he moved to NK Osijek. He made his professional debut during the 2012/13 season. His first goal came during the 2013/14 Prva HNL season. On 23 September 2014 he moved to Sampdoria.

On 30 August 2021 he returned to Italy and signed with Frosinone in Serie B.

References

External links
 
 

1996 births
Living people
People from Nova Gradiška
Association football midfielders
Croatian footballers
Croatia youth international footballers
Croatia under-21 international footballers
NK Osijek players
U.C. Sampdoria players
Bohemians 1905 players
NK Rudeš players
S.K. Beveren players
NK Slaven Belupo players
Frosinone Calcio players
Croatian Football League players
Czech First League players
Belgian Pro League players
Challenger Pro League players
Serie B players
Croatian expatriate footballers
Expatriate footballers in Italy
Expatriate footballers in the Czech Republic
Expatriate footballers in Belgium
Croatian expatriate sportspeople in Italy
Croatian expatriate sportspeople in the Czech Republic
Croatian expatriate sportspeople in Belgium